The 1992 Paris–Roubaix was the 90th running of the Paris–Roubaix single-day cycling race.

Results

References

1993
1992 in road cycling
1992 in French sport
Paris-Roubaix
April 1992 sports events in Europe